Manuela Maleeva-Fragnière was the defending champion, but retired from professional tennis during this season.

Magdalena Maleeva won the title by defeating Natasha Zvereva 7–5, 3–6, 6–4 in the final.

This event marked the first appearance of 14 year-old Martina Hingis in a professional tennis tournament. Hingis reached the second round before losing to Mary Pierce

Seeds

Draw

Finals

Top half

Bottom half

References

External links
 Official results archive (ITF)
 Official results archive (WTA)

1994 Singles
European Indoors - Singles